The Tame Valley Canal is a relatively late (1844) canal in the West Midlands of England. It forms part of the Birmingham Canal Navigations. It takes its name from the roughly-parallel River Tame.

Geography
The canal runs from Tame Valley Junction where it joins the Walsall Canal near Ocker Hill and Toll End, and terminates at Salford Junction where it meets the Birmingham & Fazeley Canal and the Grand Union Canal.

Between Tame Valley Junction and Rushall Junction it goes under the West Midlands Metro near Wednesbury and crosses over the former Grand Junction Railway (now part of the Chase Line) by aqueduct, near Tame Bridge Parkway railway station (an unusual case of the railway pre-dating a neighbouring canal).

It passes over the M5 motorway near the interchange with the M6 motorway (M6 junction 8) and joins the Rushall Canal at Rushall Junction, inside the triangle formed by the motorway junction. East of Rushall Junction the canal passes under another arm of the M5. At Hamstead the remains of a wharf can be seen, This served the former Hamstead Colliery. Further east, there are two more aqueducts (Spouthouse Lane and Piercy, the latter over the Old Walsall Road), and a deep cutting in 200-million-year-old sandstone, under Freeth Bridge (now restricted to pedestrians and bikes only) at Tower Hill. There are no locks on this section, which is at the Walsall Level, but it passes over eight aqueducts within five miles (seven of which are original).

The thirteen Perry Barr Locks, where the level drops 106 feet, start just beyond the A34. The original lock keepers cottages remain. Between locks 1 (the top lock) and 2 the canal is crossed by the Grade II listed Perry Barr Locks Bridge, a cast-iron foot bridge with brick pillars, dating from 1844. In the adjacent Perry Park, after lock 7 and near Alexander Stadium, is Perry Reservoir, a  feeder reservoir completed in 1880 and fed by Holbrook, a tributary of the Tame that rises near Barr Beacon. From there, the canal passes under the M6, and then down the remaining Perry Barr locks. Between locks nine and ten is the site of Perry Barr Wharf, extant in the 1950s but now filled in. The canal passes under the M6 twice more, including Gravelly Hill Interchange (Spaghetti Junction), shortly after which it terminates, at Salford Junction.

History

The canal was authorised by Act of Parliament in 1839 and built by the Birmingham Canal Navigations. Construction started in 1841 and it opened on Wednesday 14 February 1844. Its engineers were James Walker and Alfred Burges the company engineers. The resident engineer was Mr. Horne, the contractors were Treadwell, Jackson and Bean for the principal part of the works, and Mr. Townshend for the portion near Tipton.

Features

See also

Canals of Great Britain
History of the British canal system

Notes

References

External links

Waterscape: Tame Valley Canal
Up the Cut
Photographic guide

 

Birmingham Canal Navigations
Canals in the West Midlands (county)
Works of Thomas Telford
Canals opened in 1844
C